Harold Bradfod Enright (April 28, 1890 – March 2, 1946) was an American track and field athlete who competed in the 1912 Summer Olympics. In 1912 he finished 13th in the high jump competition.

References

External links
list of American athletes
Harold Enright's profile at Sports Reference.com

1890 births
1946 deaths
American male high jumpers
Olympic track and field athletes of the United States
Athletes (track and field) at the 1912 Summer Olympics